Kuršas was a proposed skyscraper in Gandrališkės, Klaipėda, Lithuania. If completed, the skyscraper would be the tallest residential building in the Baltic States. Designed by Donatas Rakauskas. The building is named after Courland in Latvia.

The building was approved by the city council in May 2009, but due to the global recession the project was put on hold.

See also

Vilnius TV Tower
Pilsotas
List of buildings
Tallest buildings in Lithuania
List of the world's tallest structures
List of tallest buildings and structures by country

References

External links
 Building at Emporis database

Buildings and structures in Klaipėda
Skyscrapers in Lithuania
Proposed buildings and structures in Lithuania